Trace Creek is a stream in Washington County in the U.S. state of Missouri. It is a tributary of Cub Creek.

Trace Creek most likely was so named on account of a trail near its course.

See also
List of rivers of Missouri

References

Rivers of Washington County, Missouri
Rivers of Missouri